Mohammed Adam El-Sheikh (born January 1, 1945) is the Sudanese American executive director of the Fiqh Council of North America.

Biography
El-Sheikh was born in Sudan.

Education
El-Sheikh graduated from the faculty of Shari'ah and Law of Omdurman Islamic University, Sudan, in 1969. In 1973 he was appointed by the Department of Justice to serve as a judge for the Shari'ah Courts.  
While in the Sudan he was a member of the Muslim Brotherhood.

In 1978, he was granted a scholarship to come to the United States in order to continue his higher education. He received his Masters of Comparative Jurisprudence (MCJ) from Howard University in 1980, his LLM from the National Law Center at George Washington University in 1981, and his Ph.D. in Comparative Jurisprudence from Temple University in 1986.  His 1986 Ph.D. dissertation at Temple University was on "The applicability of Islamic penal law (qisas and diyah) in the Sudan."

Career
From 1983–1989 and 1994–2003, El-Sheikh was the imam at the Islamic Society of Baltimore in Catonsville, Maryland.

El-Sheikh was instrumental in founding the Muslim American Society in the US, in 1992, along with some other former members of the Muslim Brotherhood.  He said that when they founded the society the founders' goals had changed, in that they no longer needed to operate secretly as they had in other countries when they were members of the Muslim Brotherhood.  He said the founders felt "we should cut relations with the [Brotherhood] abroad and regard ourselves as Americans. ... We don't receive an order from any organization abroad, and [they] have no authority to tell us what to do".

He also helped launch the Dar Al-Hijrah mosque in Falls Church, Virginia, and later was the Imam of the mosque between August 2003 and May 2005.  Commenting in 2004 on the beheadings of American hostages Nick Berg and Daniel Pearl, he said: beheadings are not mentioned in the Koran at all. According to Islamic penal law, killers will be sentenced to death, but the means of execution are not mentioned.  ... we don't condone this. They are not following Islam. They are following their own whims.

And in 2004, speaking of Palestinian suicide bombers, he said "if certain Muslims are to be cornered where they cannot defend themselves, except through these kinds of means, and their local religious leaders issued fatwas to permit that, then it becomes acceptable as an exceptional rule, but should not be taken as a principle."

He left Dar Al-Hijrah in 2005 to become the executive director of the Fiqh Council of North America, an association of Islamic legal scholars.  He is also the head of the Islamic Judiciary Council of the Shari'ah Scholars' Association of North America (SSANA).

Controversies
Following the announcement of Barack Obama's visit to the Islamic Society of Baltimore in 2016, many conservative media outlets accused the organization of having "historic" and "deep" ties to extremism or radical Islam, including Fox News, The Washington Times, The Daily Caller, and Breitbart News. Many of these conservative outlets focused on Mohammed Adam El-Sheikh.

In 2004, El-Sheikh told The Washington Post, "If certain Muslims are to be cornered where they cannot defend themselves, except through these kinds of means, and their local religious leaders issued fatwas to permit that, then it becomes acceptable as an exceptional rule, but should not be taken as a principle." The comment gained controversy with several media outlets, such as The Daily Caller, Fox News, and The Washington Times. ThinkProgress, however, commented that these "right-wing outlets omitted that fact that the quote was a specific reference to the uptick in violence between Israelis and Palestinians — not Americans — and that Sheikh immediately added that 'condemnation of indiscriminate killing of civilians' was widespread in his community."

El-Sheikh was a member and "leading figure" of the Muslim Brotherhood in Sudan before moving to the United States in 1978. However, as he told The Washington Post, he cut relations with the group in 1992.

El-Sheikh was also a co-founder of the Muslim American Society, a group controlled by the Muslim Brotherhood. El-Sheikh was also a regional director for the Islamic American Relief Agency, whose parent organization has been cited by the U.S. Treasury Department for connections to Al-Qaeda and the Taliban.

References

Living people
Sudanese Muslims
American imams
Temple University Beasley School of Law alumni
Muslim Brotherhood leaders
Howard University alumni
George Washington University Law School alumni
Sudanese emigrants to the United States
Omdurman Islamic University alumni
American Muslim activists
1945 births
African-American Muslims